Gohand is a town and a nagar panchayat in Hamirpur district in the Indian state of Uttar Pradesh.  It is situated on UP-SH-21 15 km from Rath & 40 km from Orai

Geography
It has an average elevation of 146 metres (479 feet).

Demographics
 India census, Gohand had a population of 7,503. Males constitute 55% of the population and females 45%. Gohand has an average literacy rate of 68.78%, lower than the national average of 74.04%: male literacy is 83.24%, and female literacy is 51.53%.  In Gohand, 11.5% of the population is under 6 years of age.

References

Cities and towns in Hamirpur district, Uttar Pradesh